AOL Dejando Huellas is a live EP by Flex. It was released on November 3, 2009.

Track listing

References

Flex (singer) albums
Spanish-language albums
2009 EPs